Spotsylvania Regional Medical Center (SRMC) is a hospital in Spotsylvania County, Virginia. The hospital is a subsidiary of Hospital Corporation of America.

History
SRMC celebrated its opening on June 7, 2010, becoming a part of the HCA Healthcare system in Virginia.

Operations
Spotsylvania Regional Medical Center is a $175 million 133 inpatient bed facility that provides a wide range of in/out patient services including emergency care, cardiac care, and behavioral health services. SRMC recently opened and operates Spotsylvania Regional Cancer Center, a center specializing in cancer treatment, in cooperation with VCU's Massey Cancer Center.

SRMC has well over 450 staff members and pays over $1.5 million to Spotsylvania County in taxes.. Spotsylvania Regional Medical Center operates as a community hospital and also provides large amounts of charity care.

Awards
In September 2010, Spotsylvania Regional Medical Center earned Health Care Project of the Year from Mid-Atlantic Construction Magazine and is Joint Commission accredited.

References

External links
 Official Website

Hospital buildings completed in 2010
Hospitals in Virginia
HCA Healthcare